Charlotte United Christian Academy is a private Christian school located in Charlotte, North Carolina. It was founded in 2009 by Resurrection Church and Garr Church.

Academic associations
Charlotte United is part of  the Greater Charlotte Association of Christian Schools and Association of Christian Schools International.

Fine arts
Charlotte United has fine arts programs. The performing arts department has produced multiple musicals. The visual arts department has produced art shows hosted by Charlotte-area museums.

References

External links
 Official Site

Christian schools in North Carolina
Private high schools in North Carolina
Private middle schools in North Carolina
Private elementary schools in North Carolina
Schools in Charlotte, North Carolina